Ch’elaqo is an exclosure located in the Dogu'a Tembien woreda of the Tigray Region in Ethiopia.

Environmental characteristics
 Area: 50 ha
 Average slope gradient: 46%
 Aspect: the exclosure is oriented towards the southwest
 Minimum altitude: 2169 metres
 Maximum altitude: 2336 metres
 Lithology: Antalo Limestone
 2018: support by the EthioTrees project

Management
As a general rule, cattle ranging and wood harvesting are not allowed. The grasses are harvested once yearly and taken to the homesteads of the village to feed livestock. Field observations showed that no illegal grazing occurred in the exclosure in 2018.

Benefits for the community
Setting aside such areas fits with the long-term vision of the communities were hiza’iti lands are set aside for use by the future generations. It has also direct benefits for the community:
 improved ground water availability
 honey production
 climate ameliorator (temperature, moisture)
 the sequestered carbon (in total 84 tonnes per ha, dominantly sequestered in the soil, and additionally in the woody vegetation) is certified using the Plan Vivo voluntary carbon standard, after which carbon credits are sold
 the revenues are then reinvested in the villages, according to the priorities of the communities; it may be for an additional class in the village school, a water pond, or conservation in the exclosures.

Biodiversity
With vegetation growth, biodiversity in this exclosure hast strongly improved, not only with regard to flora but also with regard to fauna.

References

External links
 EthioTrees on Davines website
 EthioTrees project website
 EthioTrees on Plan Vivo website
 Link For Forestry Projects
2018 establishments in Ethiopia
Land management
Environmental conservation
Environmentalism in Ethiopia
Greenhouse gas emissions
Emissions reduction
Carbon finance
Exclosures of Tigray Region
 
Dogu'a Tembien